(The post of the teacher), WAB 77, is a song composed by Anton Bruckner in  during his stay in Sankt Florian.

History 
Bruckner composed this plea for the teachers on a text possibly of Ernst Marinelli in  during his stay in Sankt Florian. Bruckner dedicated the work to his superior, schoolmaster Michael Bogner.

The song was possibly performed by the Liedertafel St. Florian for celebrating Bogner's 45th birthday.

The original manuscript of the work is lost, but copies are stored in the archives of the Liedertafel St. Florian and of the Österreichische Nationalbibliothek.

Text 
Der Lehrerstand uses a text possibly by Ernst Marinelli.

Music 
The 84-bar long work in E-flat major is scored for  choir and voice quartet. This first larger work for men's choir tries for original traits, decent effects and expressive differentiation.

Discography 
There is a single recording of Der Lehrerstand.
 Thomas Kerbl, Männerchorvereinigung Bruckner 12, Weltliche Männerchöre – CD: LIVA 054, 2012

References

Sources 
 August Göllerich, Anton Bruckner. Ein Lebens- und Schaffens-Bild,  – posthumous edited by Max Auer by G. Bosse, Regensburg, 1932
 Anton Bruckner – Sämtliche Werke, Band XXIII/2:  Weltliche Chorwerke (1843–1893), Musikwissenschaftlicher Verlag der Internationalen Bruckner-Gesellschaft, Angela Pachovsky and Anton Reinthaler (Editor), Vienna, 1989
 Cornelis van Zwol, Anton Bruckner 1824–1896 – Leven en werken, uitg. Thoth, Bussum, Netherlands, 2012. 
 Uwe Harten, Anton Bruckner. Ein Handbuch. , Salzburg, 1996. .
 Crawford Howie, Anton Bruckner - A documentary biography, online revised edition

External links 
 Der Lehrerstand C-Dur, WAB 77 – Critical discography by Hans Roelofs 
 

Weltliche Chorwerke by Anton Bruckner
1847 compositions
Compositions in E-flat major